John Henry Nash may refer to:

 John Nash (footballer)
 John Henry Nash (printer)